The 1908 West Down by-election was held on 20 March 1908.  The by-election was held due to the resignation of the incumbent Irish Unionist MP, Arthur Hill.  It was won by the Irish Unionist candidate William MacCaw.

References

1908 elections in Ireland
1908 elections in the United Kingdom
By-elections to the Parliament of the United Kingdom in County Down constituencies
20th century in County Down
March 1908 events